Ekin-Su Cülcüloğlu (born 21 August 1994) is a British actress, model and television personality of Turkish origin. After portraying the role of Isil in the Turkish soap opera Kuzey Yıldızı İlk Aşk in 2022, she won the eighth series of the ITV2 reality series Love Island alongside Davide Sanclimenti. Following her win, she starred in a travel series with Sanclimenti and competed in the fifteenth series of Dancing on Ice in 2023.

Life and career
Cülcüloğlu was born on 21 August 1994 in Islington, London to her mother Sezer, and she has a younger brother, Arda. She moved to Loughton, Essex at the age of 10. Cülcüloğlu is of Turkish descent and splits her time between Essex and Istanbul. In 2011, Cülcüloğlu competed in Miss Asia Pacific World, representing Ireland. She competed in various other beauty pageants before going on to study performing arts at the University of Central Lancashire, graduating in 2015. At the beginning of her career, Cülcüloğlu went by various stage names; Susie Hayzel, Su Hayzel and Su Ekin Cülcüloğlu.

In 2020, Cülcüloğlu was cast in the Turkish television series Kuzey Yıldızı İlk Aşk, in which she portrayed the role of Işıl, a photographer from London who saves the life of leading character Kuzey (İsmail Demirci). She also portrayed a serial killer in a Turkish soap opera. In June 2022, Cülcüloğlu became a contestant on the eighth series of Love Island. She entered the villa as a "bombshell" on Day 3. She won the series alongside Davide Sanclimenti. Following their win, they starred in a travel series on ITV2. In September 2022, she signed a deal with fashion retailer Oh Polly to become their brand ambassador. A month later, it was announced that Cülcüloğlu would compete in the fifteenth series of Dancing on Ice in 2023. She was paired with Brendyn Hatfield.

Filmography

References

1994 births
21st-century English actresses
Alumni of East 15 Acting School
Alumni of the University of Central Lancashire
English people of Turkish descent
English soap opera actresses
Living people
Love Island (2015 TV series) contestants
People from Islington (district)
Reality show winners
Television personalities from Essex